A list of films produced in the Soviet Union in 1955 (see 1955 in film).

1955

See also
1955 in the Soviet Union

External links
 Soviet films of 1955 at the Internet Movie Database

1955
Soviet
Films